The Waiatoto River is a river of the West Coast of New Zealand's South Island. Much of the river's length is within Mount Aspiring National Park.

Gallery

See also
List of rivers of New Zealand

References

Rivers of the West Coast, New Zealand
Mount Aspiring National Park
Rivers of New Zealand